Mark Nigel Rhodes (born 26 August 1957) is an English former professional footballer who played as a midfielder. He made nearly 300 appearances in the Football League, mostly for Rotherham United, in the 1970s and 1980s.

References

External links

Mark Rhodes profile at Clarets Mad

1957 births
Living people
Footballers from Sheffield
English footballers
Association football midfielders
Rotherham United F.C. players
Darlington F.C. players
Mansfield Town F.C. players
Burnley F.C. players
English Football League players
People educated at Firth Park Academy